Criva may refer to several places in Romania:

 Criva, a village in Vârvoru de Jos Commune, Dolj County
 Criva, a village in Densuş Commune, Hunedoara County
 Criva de Jos and Criva de Sus, villages in Piatra Olt town, Olt County
Criva, a tributary of the Timiș in Caraș-Severin County

and a village in Moldova:
 Criva, a commune in Briceni district